The men's triple jump event at the 1928 Olympic Games took place on August 2. Twenty-four athletes from 13 nations competed. The maximum number of athletes per nation was 4. The event was won by Mikio Oda of Japan, the nation's first medal in the men's triple jump. Levi Casey put the United States on the podium for the first time since 1924, with his silver. Vilho Tuulos of Finland took bronze, the first man to win a third medal in the event (gold in 1920, bronze in 1924).

Background

This was the eighth appearance of the event, which is one of 12 athletics events to have been held at every Summer Olympics. Returning finalists from the 1924 Games were gold medalist Nick Winter of Australia, bronze medalist Vilho Tuulos and fourth-place finisher Väinö Rainio of Finland, and sixth-place finisher Mikio Oda of Japan. Oda was the favorite this time, winning the 1923, 1925 and 1927 Far East Championships; Tuulos was still a strong contender.

Denmark and New Zealand each made their first appearance in the event. The United States competed for the eighth time, having competed at each of the Games so far.

Competition format

The competition was described as two rounds at the time, but was more similar to the modern divided final. All athletes received three jumps initially. The top six after that received an additional three jumps to improve their distance, but the initial jumps would still count if no improvement was made.

Records

These were the standing world and Olympic records (in metres) prior to the 1928 Summer Olympics.

No new world or Olympic records were set during the competition.

Schedule

Results

The six best scores advanced to the final round. Three additional rounds were jumped in the final; the results of the qualifying rounds carried over.

References

Men's triple jump
Triple jump at the Olympics
Men's events at the 1928 Summer Olympics